Vadym Schastlyvtsev (born 18 April 1998) is a professional Ukrainian football defender who has been banned for fixing games.

Career
Schastlyvtsev is a product of the FC Olimpik Donetsk Youth School System.

He signed contract with FC Olimpik Donetsk in summer 2014 and played in the Ukrainian Premier League Reserves. In July 2017 he went on loan and made his debut for Helios Kharkiv in the Ukrainian First League in a match against FC Balkany Zorya on 15 July 2017.

On 21 November 2018, he was banned from competitions for participating in fixed games.

References

External links
Statistics at FFU website (Ukr)

1998 births
Living people
Ukrainian footballers
FC Olimpik Donetsk players
FC Helios Kharkiv players
Ukrainian Premier League players
Association football defenders
FC Kramatorsk players
Ukrainian First League players
Sportspeople from Sumy Oblast